Broken Arrow was the name popularly given to Hill 391 in the south of North Korea, between the South Korean city of  Chorwon and Pyonggang in North Korea. Its correct name was Haktang-ni, but on account of its perceived similarity with an Arrow head, it was nicknamed by US troops in the area "Broken Arrow".

Haktang-ni

The hill of "Broken Arrow" is an isolated ridge about 1,500 meters long, extending from south to north and dominating the surrounding plain for hundreds of metres in each direction. It is rocky and entirely clear of cover. At the northern extremity of the hill is the steepest and highest point of the hill, the centre section plateaus before a very steep rocky outcrop to the extreme south.

Battle of Haktang-ni, October 1951

During the Korean War, in the winter of 1951, "Broken Arrow" was the site of the Battle of Haktang-ni where a small UN Belgian force held off a much larger Chinese assault for several days.

External links
 Description of the Battle
 Description of the Battle with model of the hill

References

Korean War